Rayan El Azrak (born 14 July 1999) is a Dutch professional footballer who plays as a midfielder for Eerste Divisie club MVV.

Club career
He made his Eerste Divisie debut for Jong FC Utrecht on 17 August 2018 in a game against Go Ahead Eagles, as a starter.

On 26 January 2022, El Azrak was loaned to VVV-Venlo.

El Azrak had his contract with Jong Utrecht terminated by mutual consent on 1 September 2022, making him a free agent.

On 2 February 2023, El Azrak signed a five-month contract with MVV, who picked him up on a free. He made his debut for the club on 10 February, replacing double goalscorer Ruben van Bommel in the 81st minute of a 5–1 Eerste Divisie win over TOP Oss.

Personal life
Born in the Netherlands, El Azrak is of Moroccan descent.

References

1999 births
Living people
Footballers from Amsterdam 
Dutch sportspeople of Moroccan descent
Dutch footballers
Association football midfielders
A.V.V. Zeeburgia players
Jong FC Utrecht players
VVV-Venlo players
MVV Maastricht players
Eerste Divisie players